William M. Clayton (April 24, 1824 – 1892) was an American politician.  He moved to Denver with his brother, George W. Clayton, in 1859. He served as mayor of Denver, Colorado from 1868 to 1869. He died in 1892.

The G. W. & W. M. Clayton Building is a Denver Landmark.

References

1824 births
1892 deaths
Mayors of Denver